George Augustus Frederick Henry Bridgeman, 2nd Earl of Bradford (23 October 1789 – 22 March 1865), styled Viscount Newport from 1815 to 1825, was a British peer.

The oldest son of Orlando Bridgeman, 1st Earl of Bradford, and Lucy Elizabeth Byng, Bridgeman was educated at Harrow School, London, and Trinity College, Cambridge, where he graduated with a Master of Arts in 1810. He succeeded to his father's titles and the family seat at Weston Park, Staffordshire, on 7 September 1825. His siblings were: Charles Orlando Bridgeman, Lady Lucy Whitmore, Hon. Orlando Henry Bridgeman, and Reverend Hon. Henry Edmund Bridgeman.

Family
Lord Bradford married, firstly, Georgina Elizabeth Moncreiffe, daughter of Thomas Moncreiffe, in St George's, Hanover Square, on 5 March 1818. They had six children:

Orlando George Charles Bridgeman, 3rd Earl of Bradford (1819–1898)
Reverend Hon. George Thomas Orlando Bridgeman (1823–1895)
Lady Mary Selina Louisa Bridgeman (died 1889), married Hon. Robert Windsor-Clive on 20 October 1852
Lady Lucy Caroline Bridgeman (1826–1858)
Lady Charlotte Anne Bridgeman (1827–1858)
Reverend Hon. John Robert Orlando Bridgeman (1831–1897), married Marianne Caroline Clive, daughter of the Venerable William Clive and wife Marianne Tollet, on 5 June 1862 and had a son William Clive Bridgeman, 1st Viscount Bridgeman.

Lady Lucy Caroline and Lady Charlotte Anne both died of their injuries, one week apart, as a result of their cotton dresses being set alight by the sparks from a fireplace at the family home, Weston Park.

He married, secondly, Helen Mackay, daughter of Captain Æneas Mackay, in St Peter's Church, Eaton Square, London, on 30 October 1849. He died aged 75 at Weston Park, Staffordshire, leaving an estate worth £140,000.

Notes

References

External links

1789 births
1865 deaths
People educated at Harrow School
Alumni of Trinity College, Cambridge
2
George Bridgeman